The Chicago Sinfonietta is an American orchestra based in Chicago, Illinois. It is nationally and internationally acclaimed as a cultural leader and a powerful advocate for diversity, equity and inclusion and is renowned for its groundbreaking, dynamic programming and versatility.

The orchestra was founded in 1987 under the guidance of the late conductor and Music Director Paul Freeman to address the disconnect between the lack of diversity in orchestras and the vibrant, nuanced, communities in which they play.  The orchestra's original mission was a focus on representing the city of Chicago, and representing the vibrancy of the community on stage and in the orchestra's programming. In its first decade, the group made several tours of the United States, Europe, and other overseas destinations.  In that time, (1987–1997) guest performers included the Vienna Boys Choir, Ben Vereen, and Marian McPartland.  In its second decade, the group released three new recordings and performed with guests including Poi Dog Pondering, Howard Levy, Rachel Barton Pine, Orbert Davis, and the Apostolic Church of God Choir. As the orchestra established itself during the first two decades, the mission evolved to focus on a larger scope, and has evolved into a leadership position at the forefront of progressive change in the arts.

Music Director Dr. Paul Freeman was the co-host of the National Public Radio program, The Global Maestro and conducted the Czech National Symphony Orchestra. Dr. Freeman founded the Chicago Sinfonietta after not finding enough conducting opportunities for African American conductors, instrumentalists and composers. With the announcement of Paul Freeman's planned retirement in 2011, the organization conducted a two-year international search that resulted in the 2010 announcement of international conductor Mei-Ann Chen's appointment as the Sinfonietta's second Music Director.  Maestro Freeman's final season culminated with a national broadcast of his final performance on WFMT 98.7 FM that also featured Maestro Chen and Renee' Baker as co-conductors for the evening. Maestro Chen's tenure as Music Director was formally introduced to the city on August 14, 2011 with a free concert in Millennium Park celebrating the diversity of Chicago's neighborhoods and people. Under Maestro Chen's tenure, the Chicago Sinfonietta has become known for its "defiantly different outlook", is a model for innovative and collaborative programming, and a positive influencer in the orchestral world. Its mission has since further evolved to making classical music accessible to everyone, and is summed up on the organization's website as "Chicago Sinfonietta champions diversity, equity, and inclusion by creating community through bold symphonic experiences."

The 2011-2012 Season was the first under the baton of Mei-Ann Chen.

The orchestra is based in Illinois's cultural center, with homes in two of the Chicago area's foremost destinations for classical music: at Symphony Center, the 116-year-old historical landmark housing the 2,522-seat Orchestra Hall in downtown Chicago, and Wentz Concert Hal, a 617-seat venue opened in 2008 on the campus of North Central College in the Fine Arts Center, located at Chicago Avenue and Ellsworth Street in downtown Naperville, in Chicago's western suburbs. The Chicago Sinfonietta was also the orchestra-in-residence at Dominican University for 24 years. The orchestra has also performed with the Joffrey Ballet, and at the Harris Theater for Music and Dance.

In addition to its subscription concert series with guests of national and local renown, the organization is also recognized for its myriad community programs. Chicago Sinfonietta maintains an active presence in local community schools through two programs targeting different ages: Audience Matters and Student Ensembles with Excellence and Diversity (SEED).  Audience Matters is the Sinfonietta's four-stage initiative core program, in partnership with more than 23 CPS schools and nine Aurora schools, and targets 4th, 5th, and 6th grade students. The program's focus is on instilling a love of music in young people all over Chicago and the Western Suburbs. Student Ensembles with Excellence and Diversity (SEED) is a mentoring program for talented high school musicians with Sinfonietta musicians in small ensemble settings. The orchestra's Residents Orchestrate Project re-imagines the role that an orchestra can play in historically underserved Chicago neighborhoods. It is designed to bring the Sinfonietta experience to communities in the Chicago area that might not otherwise experience them due to economic, social, geographic, or other barriers. Through this program, Chicago Sinfonietta co-curates seasonal performance programs, master classes and more through community partnerships in Austin, Back of the Yards, Garfield Park and North Lawndale. Its well-known Project Inclusion Fellowships, with training and mentoring of young musicians in the areas of administration, orchestral and ensemble performance, conducting and composition, is recognized as the largest and most successful of its kind.

Recognition from the field includes a 2020 League of American Orchestras Catalyst Award for Institutional development and Anti-racism training, a 2016 MacArthur Award for Creative and Effective Institutions – the "genius award" for non-profit organizations, an ASCAP Award for Adventurous Programming, and a First Place Award for Programming of Contemporary Music, to name a few.

References 
 
 Chicago Classical Music Website
 Paul Freeman Profile
http://www.chicagosinfonietta.org/about/
https://www.chicagotribune.com/entertainment/music/howard-reich/ct-ent-sinfonietta-season-opener-review-1019-20201018-odaapydkejhadagroz6simj7xa-story.html
https://www.chicagotribune.com/suburbs/naperville-sun/ct-nvs-ent-chicago-sinfonietta-1016-20201007-5fqcgihjh5h6fn5xfyfnvv7cxy-story.html
https://www.chicagotribune.com/entertainment/music/howard-reich/ct-ent-inclusion-sinfonietta-0927-20200925-sll7owag25etdaib2kbwjtdvma-story.html
https://www.chicagotribune.com/entertainment/music/howard-reich/ct-ent-sinfonietta-king-concert-review-0122-20200121-m2alsvzsjbfmvkj3u73qcdun2y-story.html
https://www.chicagotribune.com/entertainment/music/howard-reich/ct-ent-sinfonietta-kissin-civic-review-0515-story.html
https://www.chicagotribune.com/entertainment/music/howard-reich/ct-ent-music-sinfonietta-review-0516-story.html
https://philanthropynewsdigest.org/news/macarthur-announces-2016-awards-for-creative-effective-institutions

Musical groups established in 1987
Musical groups from Chicago
Sinfoniettas (orchestras)
Orchestras based in Illinois
Cedille Records artists